Lublin Dilja (1957 – February 2, 2009) was an Albanian Ambassador to the United Nations.

Biography
Dilja was post-communist first Albanian Ambassador to the United States from 1993 to 1997, then a member of the Democratic Party of Albania from 2001 to 2004.
    
He represented Albania as Ambassador to the U.N. on an ad interim basis, as chargé d'affaires, until he was replaced in 2006 by Adrian Neritani.

Dilja died at 51 years of age in New York City, in the United States, on February 2, 2009, following a long illness.

References

1957 births
2009 deaths
Ambassadors of Albania to the United States
Permanent Representatives of Albania to the United Nations
Democratic Party of Albania politicians